The 2016–17 Ranji Trophy is the 83rd season of the Ranji Trophy, the first-class cricket tournament in India. It is being contested by 28 teams divided into three groups. Groups A and B comprise nine teams and Group C comprises ten teams. The round 1 fixture between Rajasthan and Saurashtra was moved from Chennai to Vizianagaram because of the senior women's one-day league. The round 2 fixture between Jharkhand and Karnataka was moved from Tamil Nadu to Greater Noida because of the Kaveri River water dispute.

Karnataka, Jharkhand and Odisha all qualified for the knockout stage of the tournament, with Odisha qualifying for the knockout stage for the first time since the 2000–01 tournament. Jharkhand finished top of the table after winning their final match by an innings and 93 runs.

Points table

Fixtures

Round 1

Round 2

Round 3

Round 4

Round 5

Round 6

Round 7

Round 8

Round 9

See also
 2016–17 Ranji Trophy
 2016–17 Ranji Trophy Group A
 2016–17 Ranji Trophy Group C

References

External links
 Series home at ESPN Cricinfo

Ranji Trophy seasons
Ranji Trophy Trophy
Ranji Trophy
Ranji Trophy